State v. Palendrano, 120 N.J. Super. 336, 293 A.2d 747 (Law Div. 1972), was a legal case decided by the New Jersey Superior Court, Law Division, holding that the common law offense of being a common scold was no longer a crime despite the presence of reception statutes in the state.

Background
In 1970, Marion Palendrano was indicted in Monmouth County for assault, threatening a person's life, and being a scold.

Decision
The court reasoned that the offense was superseded by the New Jersey Disorderly Persons Act.  They also expressed concerns that a female-only crime violated due process and the nature of the offense was too vague.

See also
Commonwealth v. Donoghue, an earlier Kentucky case which upheld common law offences in that state.

References

External links

Full text opinion from Google Scholar

U.S. state criminal case law
1972 in United States case law
New Jersey state case law
1972 in New Jersey
United States gender discrimination case law
Void for vagueness case law
Monmouth County, New Jersey
History of women's rights in the United States
Common law
History of women in New Jersey